Switzerland competed at the 2012 Summer Olympics in London, from 27 July to 12 August 2012. Swiss athletes have competed at every Summer Olympic Games in the modern era, except when they boycotted the 1956 Summer Olympics in Melbourne in protest of the Soviet invasion of Hungary. The Swiss Olympic Association sent a total of 103 athletes to the 2012 Games, 72 men and 31 women, to compete in 18 sports.

Switzerland left London with a total of four Olympic medals (two gold and two silver), their lowest in Summer Olympic history since 1992. This was in stark contrast with the zero medal tally of the neighbouring Austria, a nation of roughly comparable size. Most of these medals were awarded to the athletes in cycling, tennis, equestrian, and triathlon.

Among the nation's medalists were mountain biker Nino Schurter, who won his second Olympic medal after winning the silver in men's cross-country race. Equestrian rider Steve Guerdat won Switzerland's first ever gold medal in the individual show jumping. Meanwhile, Nicola Spirig became the second Swiss athlete to claim an Olympic title in women's triathlon since its official debut as a full-medal sport in 2000. World number-one male tennis player Roger Federer won the coveted silver medal in the men's singles, after he was defeated by Great Britain's Andy Murray. Several Swiss athletes missed out of the medal standings. Defending Olympic champion Fabian Cancellara finished seventh in the men's individual time trial, following the collarbone injury he received in the road race.

Medalists

Delegation 
The Swiss Olympic Association selected a team of 103 athletes, 72 men and 31 women, to compete in 18 sports, their largest delegation ever surpassing the record set in Sydney by a single athlete. Men's football was the only team-based sport in which Switzerland were represented in these Olympic Games. There was only a single competitor in badminton, BMX cycling and Greco-Roman wrestling. Athletics was the largest team in the individual sports, with a total of 15 competitors.

The Swiss team featured three defending champions from Beijing: road cyclist Fabian Cancellara, and tennis doubles players Roger Federer and Stanislas Wawrinka. Federer was offered the honour of carrying the Swiss flag for the third time after he won the Wimbledon Championships, and reached the top of the men's world tennis rankings. However, he nominated his compatriot and close friend Wawrinka to perform the duty at the opening ceremony instead. Along with Federer, three other Swiss athletes made their fourth Olympic appearance: marathon runner Viktor Röthlin, Star sailor Flavio Marazzi, and quadruple sculls rower André Vonarburg. Equestrian show jumper Pius Schwizer, at age 49, was the oldest athlete of the team, while all-around gymnast Giulia Steingruber was the youngest at age 18.

Other notable Swiss athletes featured mountain biker and bronze medalist Nino Schurter, freestyle swimmer and six-time national record holder Dominik Meichtry, triathletes Sven Riederer and Nicola Spirig, and equestrian show jumper Steve Guerdat, who led his team by winning the bronze medal in Beijing.

| width=78% align=left valign=top |
The following is the list of number of competitors participating in the Games. Note that reserves in fencing, field hockey, football, and handball are not counted as athletes:

Archery

Switzerland qualified two archers in men's and women's individual events.

Athletics

14 Swiss athletes qualified for the athletics events.

Key
 Note – Ranks given for track events are within the athlete's heat only
 Q = Qualified for the next round
 q = Qualified for the next round as a fastest loser or, in field events, by position without achieving the qualifying target
 NR = National record
 PB = Personal best
 N/A = Round not applicable for the event
 Bye = Athlete not required to compete in round

Men
Track & road events

Women
Track & road events

*4 × 100 m relay reserves: Jacqueline Gasser and Clélia Reuse

Field events

Combined events – Heptathlon

Badminton

On 11 May 2012, Sabrina Jaquet qualified to compete in the Olympic Badminton Women's singles.

Canoeing

Slalom
Switzerland has so far qualified boats for the following events:

Cycling

Road
Fabian Cancellara was the defending Olympic champion in the men's time trial event and the 2008 Olympic silver medallist in the road race event. In the road race on 28 July, he fell and bruised his collarbone when he hit the safety bars with 15 kilometres to go. He finished in 106th place. Because of his pain, he changed his positioning on the bike and was able to take part in the time-trial event, but was unable to retain his title and finished in seventh place.

Mountain biking

In September 2011, Nino Schurter qualified for the Olympic Mountain Bike event. Ralf Näf and Florian Vogel were qualified on 25 May 2012. Fabian Giger was also named first reserve in case of a withdrawal. On 25 May 2012 Katrin Leumann and Esther Süss qualified for the Olympic Mountain Bike event.

BMX

Equestrian

Jumping
Switzerland has qualified a team in the jumping event because they were one of the three best non-qualified teams in the team event of the 2011 European Show Jumping Championship.

* A maximum of three riders from a single country can advance to the individual final. Therefore, Werner Muff did not advance, as Switzerland had three riders with fewer penalty points.

Fencing

On 11 May 2012, Fabian Kauter and Max Heinzer qualified for the men's individual épée and Tiffany Geroudet (18) qualified for the women's individual épée. Both Fabian Kauter and Max Heinzer lost in the round of 16 to Yannick Borel (21) and Rubén Limardo (13), respectively. Tiffany Geroudet lost in the round of 16 to the eventual 2012 bronze medallist Sun Yujie (1).

Men

Women

Football

Switzerland men's football team qualified for the event by reaching the final of the 2011 UEFA European Under-21 Football Championship.
 Men's team event – 1 team of 18 players

Men's tournament

Squad

Group play

Gymnastics

Artistic
Men

Women

Judo

Switzerland has qualified 2 judokas.

Rowing

On 11 May 2012, Augustin Maillefer, Nico Stahlberg, Florian Stofer and André Vonarburg qualified for the Olympic Rowing quadruple sculls and Mario Gyr, Simon Niepmann, Simon Schürch and Lucas Tramèr qualified for the Olympic Rowing lightweight four.

Men

Qualification Legend: FA=Final A (medal); FB=Final B (non-medal); FC=Final C (non-medal); FD=Final D (non-medal); FE=Final E (non-medal); FF=Final F (non-medal); SA/B=Semifinals A/B; SC/D=Semifinals C/D; SE/F=Semifinals E/F; QF=Quarterfinals; R=Repechage

Sailing

On 5 June 2012, Yannick Brauchli, Romuald Hausser, Flavio Marazzi, Enrico De Maria and Richard Stauffacher qualified to compete in the Olympic Sailing Men's events and Nathalie Brugger qualified to compete in the Olympic Sailing Women's event.

Men

Women

M = Medal races; BFD = Black flag disqualification; EL = Eliminated – did not advance into the medal race;

Shooting

Switzerland has earned seven quota places.

Men

Women

Swimming

Swiss swimmers have so far achieved qualifying standards in the following events (up to a maximum of two swimmers in each event at the Olympic Qualifying Time (OQT), and one at the Olympic Selection Time (OST):

Men

Women

Synchronized swimming

Switzerland has qualified 2 quota places in synchronized swimming.

Tennis

Triathlon

Switzerland has qualified four athletes.

Volleyball

Beach

Wrestling

On 11 May 2012, Pascal Strebel qualified to compete in the Olympic Greco-Roman wrestling.

Key
  – Victory by Fall.
  – Decision by Points – the loser with technical points.
  – Decision by Points – the loser without technical points.

Men's Greco-Roman

References

Summer Olympics
Nations at the 2012 Summer Olympics
2012